The 2002 Kansas City Royals season involved the Royals finishing 4th in the American League Central with a record of 62 wins and 100 losses, their first 100 loss season in franchise history.

Offseason
December 18, 2001: Chuck Knoblauch was signed as a free agent with the Kansas City Royals.
December 19, 2001: Traded a PTBNL to the Chicago Cubs for Michael Tucker. The Royals sent Shawn Sonnier to Chicago on March 15, 2002, to complete the trade.
January 10, 2002: Paul Byrd was signed as a free agent with the Kansas City Royals.
March 28, 2002: Donzell McDonald was assigned to the Kansas City Royals by the Cleveland Indians.

Regular season

Season standings

American League Wild Card

Record vs. opponents

Notable transactions
June 4, 2002: Zack Greinke was drafted by the Kansas City Royals in the 1st round (6th pick) of the 2002 amateur draft. Player signed July 13, 2002.

Roster

Player stats

Batting

Starters by position 
Note: Pos = Position; G = Games played; AB = At bats; H = Hits; Avg. = Batting average; HR = Home runs; RBI = Runs batted in

Other batters 
Note: G = Games played; AB = At bats; H = Hits; Avg. = Batting average; HR = Home runs; RBI = Runs batted in

Pitching

Starting pitchers 
Note: G = Games pitched; IP = Innings pitched; W = Wins; L = Losses; ERA = Earned run average; SO = Strikeouts

Other pitchers 
Note: G = Games pitched; IP = Innings pitched; W = Wins; L = Losses; ERA = Earned run average; SO = Strikeouts

Relief pitchers 
Note: G = Games pitched; W = Wins; L = Losses; SV = Saves; ERA = Earned run average; SO = Strikeouts

Farm system

Notes

References 
2002 Kansas City Royals at Baseball Reference
2002 Kansas City Royals at Baseball Almanac

Kansas City Royals seasons
Kansas City Royals season
Kansas